is a former Japanese football player. She played for Japan national team.

National team career
Mishima was born on May 3, 1957. In June 1981, she was selected Japan national team for 1981 AFC Championship. At this competition, on June 11, she debuted against Thailand. In September, she also played against Italy. However Japan was defeated this match by a score of 0–9. This is the biggest defeat in the history of Japan national team. She played 2 games for Japan in 1981.

National team statistics

References

1957 births
Living people
Jissen Women's University alumni
Japanese women's footballers
Japan women's international footballers
Women's association footballers not categorized by position